The National Union of Warehouse and General Workers was a trade union representing workers, mostly in commercial warehouses, in the United Kingdom.

The union was founded in 1911 when six local unions in Liverpool and Manchester merged, forming the Amalgamated General and Warehouse Workers' Union.  Although the majority of members worked in commercial warehouses, one of the founding unions included tobacco workers, who also transferred to the new union.  In 1913, the union renamed itself as the "National Union of Warehouse and General Workers".

The membership of the union varied considerably; it had 6,000 members on formation, but this fell to 4,000 the following year, before rising to 7,688 in 1915.  It recruited huge numbers of members during World War I, and by 1920 claimed a membership of 96,000.  It was particularly successful in recruiting toymakers, and by the end of the war, around 2,000 of its members worked in the sector.

At the start of 1921, the union merged with the Amalgamated Union of Co-operative Employees, forming the National Union of Distributive and Allied Workers.

General Secretaries
1911: Joseph Cleary
c.1920: William Albert Robinson

References

Defunct trade unions of the United Kingdom
1911 establishments in the United Kingdom
Trade unions established in 1911
Retail trade unions
Trade unions disestablished in 1921
1921 disestablishments in the United Kingdom
Trade unions based in Merseyside